Khaneqah (also Romanized as Khāneqāh and Khānaqāh; also known as Khanaeh, Khānagāh, Khānayeh, and Khāngāh) is a village in Dizaj Rural District, in the Central District of Khoy County, West Azerbaijan Province, Iran. At the 2006 census, its population was 460, in 93 families.

References 

Populated places in Khoy County